Mathieu James Patrick Smith (born 7 June 1989) is an English professional footballer who plays as a striker for  club Salford City.

Career

Early years
Smith spent a year as a trainee at Cheltenham Town, before being released at the age of 18. He then moved into non-league football with New Mills, whilst studying at the University of Manchester. He made his debut for New Mills in the North West Counties Premier League as a substitute against Silsden in October 2008, scoring in a 2–0 win. He went on to play a crucial role in the club's 21 game winning run, scoring 13 goals over the season including a hat trick against Alsager Town in April 2009. As he was due to spend a year studying in America, he left the Millers that summer.

Upon his return to England, ahead of the 2010–11 season, Smith signed for Redditch United in the Conference North. He initially went on a short-term loan with Midland Combination Division One side Littleton, scoring nine goals in three games. Upon returning to Redditch United, Smith scored five goals in six games and subsequently moved to Droylsden in September 2010, largely due to the club's close proximity to Manchester University where he was completing his studies. Smith rejoined Redditch in December, before making a final move to Solihull Moors in February 2011, where he scored 12 goals in 15 appearances. He finished the season having scored 21 goals in the Conference North.

Oldham Athletic

On 23 May 2011, Smith joined League One side Oldham Athletic, signing a two-year contract. He made his professional debut on the opening day of the 2011–12 season against Sheffield United and scored his first professional goal 10 days later on 16 August, the winner in a 2–1 win against Scunthorpe. Smith was limited to only 4 starts in 35 appearances for the Latics in his first season at the club, and so on 15 March 2012, manager Paul Dickov allowed Smith to go on loan to League Two side Macclesfield Town for the remaining six weeks of the season, where he made eight appearances and scored one goal.

On 27 January 2013, in Smith's second season at the club, he scored two goals in a 3–2 win over Liverpool in the fourth round of the FA Cup. In the fifth round on 16 February 2013, Smith then scored a 95th-minute equaliser against Everton to achieve a 2–2 draw. Oldham's FA Cup campaign continued with a fifth-round replay at Goodison Park on 26 February, in which they lost 3–1 with Smith again scoring for Oldham, meaning he finished Oldham's FA Cup campaign with four goals from four appearances and all goals coming against Premier League opposition. For his performance in the fifth round, Smith was voted as the Player of the Round. Smith scored three goals in his last three appearances of the season, against Bury, Yeovil and Crawley, which all culminated in wins and ultimately ensured Oldham's survival in League One. As a result, he won League One Player of the Month for April 2013. Smith finished the 2012–13 season with 11 goals in all competitions. On 23 May 2013, with reported interest from a host of Championship clubs, Smith rejected an improved contract offer from Oldham Athletic.

Leeds United
On 10 June 2013, Smith signed a two-year contract with Championship club Leeds United after turning down a new contract with Oldham Athletic. He made his Leeds United debut as a substitute in the opening game of the season against Brighton & Hove Albion on 3 August, assisting Luke Murphy's 94th-minute winner in Leeds' 2–1 win. Smith scored his first goal for Leeds soon after on 27 August 2013 against Doncaster Rovers in their 3–1 League Cup second round win. He followed this up with goals in the league against Burnley, Birmingham City, Huddersfield Town, Watford, Doncaster and Blackburn Rovers. However, on 11 January Smith was sent off for violent conduct just two minutes after coming on as substitute in a 6–0 defeat against Sheffield Wednesday, for which he received a three-game ban.

On 15 January, Smith announced he was unfazed by transfer speculation linking him with a move to Premier League side Crystal Palace. He finished the 2013–14 season with 13 goals in all competitions.

On 11 July, whilst on pre-season camp in Italy, he scored six goals in a friendly against Italian side FC Gherdeina. On 18 August, at the start of the 2014–15 season and following a successful debut year at the club, Smith signed a new three-year contract. One week later, he scored his first goal of the season against Bradford City in the League Cup, opening the scoring in a 2–1 defeat. The following week, on the final day of the transfer window, Smith was sold to Fulham.

Fulham
On 1 September 2014, Fulham signed Smith for an undisclosed fee on a three-year contract. Smith was given a straight red card 18 minutes into his Fulham debut in a 3–0 loss against Reading. Following the sacking of Felix Magath a week later, and the subsequent appointment of Kit Symons as manager soon after, Smith was limited to a further two substitute appearances in almost three months at Craven Cottage.

Bristol City (loan)
In turn, Smith went on loan to League One side Bristol City on 25 November for two months. This was then later extended by a further month until 1 March. After joining Bristol City on loan, Smith registered his first goal for the club in his fifth appearance, scoring the opener in a 2–1 home victory against West Country rivals Yeovil Town on Boxing Day. This began a sequence of nine goals in five games – including four in one match, away at Gillingham in the Football League Trophy semi-final. After completing his hat-trick with a back-heel, Smith's fourth was a half-volley from the angle of the penalty area, which later won the "Goal of the Tournament". He was the first player to score four goals in a game for Bristol City since Paul Agostino against St Albans in 1996. Another goal from Smith in the second leg of the tie helped secure Bristol City a place in the Football League Trophy final at Wembley against Walsall on 22 March, however due to his loan agreement ending on 1 March, he would be ineligible to play in this fixture. Despite this, manager Steve Cotterill insisted Smith join the squad on their trip to Wembley as a guest, to which Smith said he felt "honoured" and added it was "a touch of class from the manager." Soon after, Smith took his tally to 13 goals for the Robins when he opened the scoring against Sheffield United. On the conclusion of his loan spell, Cotterill hailed Smith's impact and contribution at the club over the course of the three months as "huge".

Return to Fulham

Smith returned to Fulham on 1 March and scored his first goal for the club five days later in his Craven Cottage debut against Bournemouth. In the following game, Smith scored the equalizer against Sheffield Wednesday away at Hillsborough in a 1–1 draw. He then went on to score goals against Wigan, Blackpool and Norwich. Smith finished the 2014–15 season with 19 goals in all competitions.

Queens Park Rangers
On 31 January 2017, the final day of the January transfer window, QPR signed Smith for an undisclosed fee on a three-and-a-half year contract. He contributed 20 league goals in his first full season at the club, with 11 goals and 9 assists in the Championship, which also made him the club's top goal scorer in the 2017–18 season.

Millwall

On 1 July 2019, Smith signed for Millwall on a two-year contract for an undisclosed fee. In his first season with the club, Smith scored 14 goals in all competitions, making him the club's top goalscorer in the 2019–20 season. This included a 13-minute hat-trick in a win over Nottingham Forest on 6 March 2020, away at the City Ground.

Salford City
On 19 January 2022, Smith signed an 18-month contract with EFL League Two side Salford City.

Style of play
Former Oldham manager Lee Johnson as well as former Oldham caretaker manager Tony Philliskirk have likened Smith to Duncan Ferguson or Andy Carroll. Following Oldham's 3–2 win at home to Liverpool in January 2013, Liverpool manager Brendan Rodgers compared Smith to Didier Drogba.

Personal life
Smith's father Ian is a former professional footballer having played for both Queen's Park and Hearts in the Scottish Football League, and for Birmingham City in the English First Division. His grandfather, James, is also a former professional who played league football for St Mirren and Clyde. His half-brother Jean-Francois is a former professional basketball player, who played for Hyères-Toulon Var Basket in the French Pro A League. Smith's father-in-law is football manager and former player Steve Bruce.

Smith completed his A-Levels in Cheltenham's Pate's Grammar School whilst a trainee at Cheltenham Town. In September 2007 he went to Manchester to study for a degree at Manchester Business School, University of Manchester, with a year spent in the United States at Arizona State University. He graduated in the summer of 2011 with a 2:1 in International Management with American Business Studies. Whilst at Manchester he was also captain of the university's men's football team, was called up to the Great Britain squad for the World University Games in China in 2011 and was nominated for the university's Sportsman of the Year Award.

Despite being English-born, Smith is also eligible for both the Scotland and France national teams as his father Ian was born in Edinburgh and his mother Françoise was born in Paris.

Career statistics

Honours

Club
Bristol City
Football League One: 2014–15 
Football League Trophy: 2014–15

Individual
 Leeds United Community Player of the Year: 2013–14
 Football League One Player of the Month: April 2013
 FA Cup Player of the Fifth Round: 2012–13 vs. Everton

References

External links

1989 births
Living people
Footballers from Birmingham, West Midlands
English footballers
Association football forwards
New Mills A.F.C. players
Redditch United F.C. players
Littleton F.C. players
Droylsden F.C. players
Solihull Moors F.C. players
Oldham Athletic A.F.C. players
Macclesfield Town F.C. players
Leeds United F.C. players
Fulham F.C. players
Bristol City F.C. players
Queens Park Rangers F.C. players
Millwall F.C. players
Salford City F.C. players
National League (English football) players
English Football League players
People educated at Pate's Grammar School
Alumni of the University of Manchester
English people of Scottish descent
English people of French descent